The Andreu government is the incumbent regional government of La Rioja led by President Concha Andreu. It was formed in August 2019 after the regional election.

Government

References

2019 establishments in La Rioja (Spain)
Cabinets established in 2019
Cabinets of La Rioja (Spain)